"Bulldog" Ben Robinson is an American politician who served as a member of the Oklahoma Senate between 1989 and 2004. He retired in 2004 due to term limits.

He ran for Oklahoma's 2nd congressional district in the  2022 midterm elections.

Career

Oklahoma Senate
Robinson was first elected to the Oklahoma Senate in 1988.

Robinson ran for reelection to a second term in 1992.

In 1996, Robinson faced a primary challenge from former state representative John Monks of Muskogee, who had lost his Oklahoma House of Representatives seat two years prior. Robinson defeated Monks in the primary with 64% of the vote. Despite trailing by a large margin, Monks requested a recount. The recount stopped at Monks request after 3 of 36 precincts were recounted, resulting in Robinson gaining three votes.

In the 2000 election Robinson faced Republican Tommy Anderson, a Muskogee School board member. He was reelected with 16,225 votes  to Anderson's 7,550 votes.

Robinson retired in 2004 due to term limits. He endorsed John Edwards in the 2004 Democratic presidential primary.

2022 Congressional campaign
Robinson left the Democratic Party and filed to run as an Independent for Oklahoma's 2nd congressional district in the 2022 midterm elections.

References

20th-century American politicians
21st-century American politicians
Candidates in the 2022 United States House of Representatives elections
Democratic Party Oklahoma state senators
Living people
Oklahoma Independents
Year of birth missing (living people)